MUTUNTU is a sector(Umurenge) in Karongi district, Western Province, Rwanda.
The population in 2012 was 23,084.
This also contain Gasenyi popular place in  Karongi district. Nearest Karongi Tea Factory and Musango Hospital.It also contain town
called Gasenyi.

References

External links
http://www.statoids.com/yrw.html
https://sobanukirwa.rw/rw/body/umurenge_wa_mutuntu
https://www.kigalitoday.com/amakuru/amakuru-mu-rwanda/article/mutuntu

Geography of Rwanda
Populated places in Rwanda